Auchy-les-Mines is a commune in the Pas-de-Calais department in the Hauts-de-France region of France. Until 1926 it was named Auchy-lez-La-Bassée.

Geography

Coal mining

Work on Mine 8 at Auchy-les-Mines began by the Compagnie des mines de Béthune in July 1891, and the mine was opened in November 1893.
Shaft 8bis was started in November 1893.

During World War I (1914–18) the front stabilized in the autumn of 1914 and a war of position began.
The Mines de Béthune concession was cut in two along a line from Auchy-les-Mines to Liévin, with Mines 4 and 8 occupied by the Germans.
Mine 4 (Vermelles) was recovered in December 1914, but Mine 8 (Auchy) was not recovered until the German troops withdrew at the end of the war.
A long gallery led from the main Mines de Béthune concession to Mine 8 in Auchy in the northeast.
Shaft 8 was blocked by the Germans between the  level and the lower level, but below the blockage the French could freely work the coal seams, even under the German side.
Pumps were brought back into service below the shafts to drain the sector.

British soldiers of the 170th Tunneling Company established a listening system at the bottom of shaft 8bis which picked up sounds of activity in August 1917.
In early September there was an underground struggle in which the Germans were forced out of the mine.
The people around the base of Shaft 8 died, but those further away escaped via the ladders of Shaft 9.
After the attack a thick masonry wall was built in the main haulage gallery to isolate the sectors near shafts 8 and 8bis.
The Germans blew up the casing of Shaft 8 and the heads of Shafts 8 and 8bis.
The mine was reopened after the war, and finally closed in 1961.

Population

Sights
 The church of St. Martin, rebuilt, as was the entire village, after World War I.
 The Hohenzollern Redoubt, a German fortification on the Western Front in World War I.

See also
Communes of the Pas-de-Calais department

References

Sources

External links

History of the town

Communes of Pas-de-Calais